Jovan Zucović (born 17 April 1990) is a Serbian footballer who last played as a defender for Ulaanbaatar City.

Career
In January 2020, Zucović joined Ulaanbaatar City in Mongolia under newly hired Serbian coach Vojislav Bralušić.

References

External links
 
 

1990 births
Living people
Sportspeople from Kraljevo
Association football defenders
Serbian footballers
FK Smederevo players
FK Jedinstvo Ub players
FK Sinđelić Beograd players
FK Sloga Kraljevo players
FK Dinamo Vranje players
Ulaanbaatar City FC players
Serbian First League players
Serbian expatriate footballers
Serbian expatriate sportspeople in Sweden
Expatriate footballers in Sweden
Expatriate footballers in Mongolia